Nika Kentchadze (born 17 April 1997) is a Georgian freestyle wrestler. He won one of the bronze medals in the men's 79 kg event at the 2021 World Wrestling Championships held in Oslo, Norway. He is also a two-time bronze medalist at the European Wrestling Championships.

Career 

In 2018, he won one of the bronze medals in the 79 kg event at the European U23 Wrestling Championship held in Istanbul, Turkey. A few months later, at the 2018 World U23 Wrestling Championship held in Bucharest, Romania, he won the gold medal in the 79 kg event.

He won one of the bronze medals in the 79 kg event at the 2019 European Wrestling Championships held in Bucharest, Romania. He repeated this two years later in the 79 kg event at the 2021 European Wrestling Championships held in Warsaw, Poland.

Major results

References

External links 
 

Living people
1997 births
Place of birth missing (living people)
Male sport wrestlers from Georgia (country)
European Wrestling Championships medalists
World Wrestling Championships medalists
21st-century people from Georgia (country)